Ivan Patzaichin (26 November 1949 – 5 September 2021) was a Romanian canoe racing coach and sprint canoeist. He took part in all major competitions between 1968 and 1984, including five consecutive Olympics, and won seven Olympic and 22 world championship medals, including four Olympic gold medals. This makes him the most decorated Romanian canoeist of all time.

He later worked as a canoeing coach, attending five more Olympics in this capacity. In 1990 he was awarded the Olympic Order, and in 2006 a nationwide poll included him on the list 100 Greatest Romanians of all time.

Biography

Patzaichin was born in a Russian Lipovan family in the village Mila 23, Tulcea County. His father Vicol was a fisherman and his mother Alexandra was a dressmaker. He took up canoeing at an early age inspired by his grandfather, and decided to pursue a canoeing career after watching a television broadcast of two canoers from his village, more specifically Vicol Calabiciov and Serghei Covaliov, winning the 1966 world title in doubles. In 1967, aged 18, he moved to the Romanian capital Bucharest, where he joined the club Dinamo. One year later, in 1968, he was included in the national team and won an Olympic gold medal, rowing with Covaliov.

At the 1972 Olympics, Patzaichin broke his oar and placed last in the singles heats. Yet he managed to finish the race, paddling with a piece of wood that he removed from the floor of his canoe, and was included in the repechage. He eventually won the repechage and the final race. In the doubles, he again teamed with Covaliov and placed second, just 0.03 seconds behind the winners.

Patzaichin spent his entire career with Dinamo, first as a trainee and competitor, rowing 4,000–5,000 km per year in his prime, and then as a coach. His most famous trainees are Olympic champions Florin Popescu and Mitică Pricop. A statue of Patzaichin is installed outside of the Dinamo main office. Besides canoeing, he also founded the association Ivan Patzachin – Mila 23 and launched the national project Rowmania aiming to promote heritage tourism and other outdoor activities. Patzaichin owned his own line of clothing made from natural products.

In 1976, Patzaichin married Georgiana, a woman he met in August 1975. They have a daughter Ivona Beatrice (born  1979), who works at the National Commission of Hospital Accreditation.

He was involved in an animation project in 2020, dubbing into Romanian the character Scroop in the Disney movie Treasure Planet.

Ivan Patzaichin died on 5 September, aged 71, in Bucharest, after having been hospitalized for three months with lung cancer.  He was 71.

Awards and honors
Silver Olympic Order (1990)
Officer of the Order of Faithful Service (Romania, 2000)
1st class Order of Sports Merit (2008)
 Military rank brigadier general (1 December 2004)
 Nihil Sine Deo (2010)

See also
List of multiple Olympic gold medalists

References

External links

 
 
 

1949 births
2021 deaths
People from Tulcea County
Romanian people of Russian descent
Canoeists at the 1968 Summer Olympics
Canoeists at the 1972 Summer Olympics
Canoeists at the 1976 Summer Olympics
Canoeists at the 1980 Summer Olympics
Canoeists at the 1984 Summer Olympics
Olympic canoeists of Romania
Olympic gold medalists for Romania
Olympic silver medalists for Romania
Romanian male canoeists
Olympic medalists in canoeing
Recipients of the Olympic Order
ICF Canoe Sprint World Championships medalists in Canadian
Medalists at the 1984 Summer Olympics
Medalists at the 1980 Summer Olympics
Medalists at the 1972 Summer Olympics
Medalists at the 1968 Summer Olympics
Deaths from cancer in Romania
Deaths from lung cancer
Romanian generals
Romanian Freemasons